Kenneth Copeland Airport  is a public airport located eighteen miles (29 km) northwest of the central business district (CBD) of Fort Worth, in Tarrant County, Texas, United States.

The airport is used solely for general aviation purposes, mainly those of the airport's eponym, televangelist Kenneth Copeland (whose ministry is located near the airport).

The airport was formerly known as Marine Corps Air Station Eagle Mountain Lake, until it was purchased by Kenneth Copeland Ministries in the 1980s.

Facilities 
Kenneth Copeland Airport has one runway:
 Runway 17/35: 6,000 x 125 ft. (1,829 x 38 m), Surface: Concrete

References

External links 

Airports in Fort Worth, Texas
Airports in Tarrant County, Texas